Alan Newton (6 April 1894 – 27 March 1979) was an Australian cricketer. He played 27 first-class matches for Tasmania between 1911 and 1934. He was also an A Grade tennis player and represented Tasmania in Australasian Championships from 1924 to 1926.

See also
 List of Tasmanian representative cricketers

References

External links
 

1894 births
1979 deaths
Australian cricketers
Tasmania cricketers
Cricketers from Tasmania
Australian male tennis players